Elections to Liverpool Town Council were held on Thursday 1 
November 1860. One third of the council seats were up for election, the term of office 
of each councillor being three years.

Thirteen of the sixteen wards were uncontested.

After the election, the composition of the council was:

Election result

Because only three of the sixteen seats were contested, these statistics should be taken in that context.

Ward results

* - Retiring Councillor seeking re-election

Abercromby

Castle Street

Everton

Exchange

Great George

Lime Street

North Toxteth

Pitt Street

Rodney Street

St. Anne Street

St. Paul's

St. Peter's

Scotland

South Toxteth

Vauxhall

West Derby

By-elections

See also

Liverpool City Council

Liverpool Town Council elections 1835 - 1879

Liverpool City Council elections 1880–present

Mayors and Lord Mayors 
of Liverpool 1207 to present

History of local government in England

References

1860
1860 English local elections
November 1860 events
1860s in Liverpool